Daikichi Irokawa (Irokawa Daikichi; 23 July 1925 – 7 September 2021) was a Japanese historian.

Biography
Irokawa studied at the University of Tokyo. He also sought to tout Japan's rise to prominence in the second half of the 20th century. He was inspired by the works of author Kunio Yanagita and started a daily segment titled Minshūshi, which focused on the daily life of the Japanese population and the evolution of their values.

Daikichi Irokawa died in Yamanashi Prefecture on 7 September 2021 at the age of 96.

References

1925 births
2021 deaths
20th-century Japanese historians
University of Tokyo alumni
People from Chiba Prefecture